John Kelburne Lawson (27 December 1886 – 19 December 1941) was a Canadian military officer who served as commander of the West Brigade during the Battle of Hong Kong. A brigadier, he was the most senior officer to be killed in action during the battle, and the highest-ranking Canadian soldier killed in action in the Second World War.

Early career 
Lawson was born in Hull, East Riding of Yorkshire.  He emigrated to Edmonton in 1914 where he worked as a clerk for the Hudson's Bay Company. He enlisted in the Canadian Expeditionary Force (CEF) upon the outbreak of the First World War. He joined the 9th Battalion, CEF, and variously worked at the 1st Canadian Motor Machine Gun Brigade and at Corps Headquarters.  Although he is often incorrectly attributed a Military Cross for actions at the Battle of Passchendaele or the Battle of the Somme, he was twice mentioned in despatches and received the French Croix de guerre.  Lawson joined as a private in 1914 and rose to the rank of warrant officer first class before commissioning.  He held the rank of captain at the end of the war.

Lawson joined the Permanent Active Militia during the interwar years.  He held various positions in Calgary, Kingston, Toronto, and Ottawa. He completed staff college in Quetta in 1923–1924, and was posted to the War Office in London, England, in 1930.

When the Second World War broke out, he was Director of Military Training in Ottawa. He was given command of the Royal Rifles of Canada, The Winnipeg Grenadiers, and the other Canadian support units which arrived in Hong Kong on 16 November 1941 to reinforce the British garrison ahead of the Battle of Hong Kong (8–25 December 1941).

Battle of Hong Kong

After the forces defending Kowloon were withdrawn to the island of Hong Kong on 11 December 1941, General Christopher Maltby organized the defence of the island into two brigades, west and east. Lawson was placed in charge of the west brigade, which included the Winnipeg Grenadiers, the Royal Scots, the Punjab Regiment (India) and the Canadian Signallers. The Japanese landed on Hong Kong Island on 18 December 1941 with the intent to split the defenders in two. After fierce fighting, Japanese forces surrounded Lawson's headquarters at around 10 a.m. on 19 December. Lawson radioed his commanders that he was "going outside to fight his way out" and left his splinter proof shelter with a small group of his officers. He was killed  immediately after leaving his shelters by a burst of Japanese machine gun fire.

When the Japanese arrived and found his body, they gave him a military burial nearby in Wong Nai Chong Gap out of respect for his courage. A chaplain was allowed to remove Lawson's silver identification disc bracelet and held on to it through four years as a Japanese prisoner of war before returning it to Lawson's family in Canada. Meanwhile, Hong Kong was relieved only on 16 September 1945, more than a month after the war ended.

The original headstone erected by the Japanese was removed after the war. Lawson was reburied at the Sai Wan War Cemetery after the war. A memorial plate was erected by the Canadian government at the site in 2005.

Personal life
Lawson was married to Augusta Hawkesworth Wilson in 1930 and had two sons,  Arthur John (b. 1934) and Michael Ivan (b. 1936).

His family donated his medals to the Royal Canadian Military Institute.

See also
John Robert Osborn

References

External links 

Commonwealth War Graves Commission entry
Canada at War:The Battle of Hong Kong 
Generals of World War II

1886 births
1941 deaths
Canadian Army personnel of World War II
Canadian military personnel killed in World War II
Royal Canadian Regiment officers
Military personnel from Kingston upon Hull
English emigrants to Canada
History of Hong Kong
Battle of Hong Kong
Canadian Expeditionary Force officers
Alumni of the University of London
Recipients of the Croix de Guerre 1914–1918 (France)
Burials at Sai Wan War Cemetery
Canadian military personnel of World War I
Graduates of the Staff College, Quetta